Ascension is the first studio album by American hip hop artist Pep Love. It was released by Hiero Imperium on July 24, 2001.

Critical reception

Nathan Rabin of The A.V. Club commented that "Pep Love is another Hieroglyphics original, even if his ambitious but flawed debut remains as notable for its unfulfilled promise as for its uneven execution." Matt Conway of AllMusic wrote, "While Ascension is a notch below the classic debuts delivered by Love's more established teammates, it is a critical building block, as it generates renewed faith in the Hiero collective." Del F. Cowie of Exclaim! praised his "commanding flow" and "rich vocabulary," stating that "he is nothing short of impressive, balancing an insistent philosophical edge with the urge to hand out verbal beat-downs."

In 2014, Paste placed it at number 6 on the "12 Classic Hip-Hop Albums That Deserve More Attention" list.

Track listing

Personnel
Credits adapted from liner notes.

 Pep Love – vocals, art direction
 Jay-Biz – production (1, 11), turntables (5, 10, 16)
 A-Plus – production (2, 3, 5, 6, 12, 13, 16)
 DJ Lex – turntables (3, 6, 8, 15, 16)
 Casual – background vocals (4), vocals (14), production (14), recording
 DJ Babu – turntables (4)
 Evidence – production (4), recording (4), mixing (4)
 Kurt Matlin – recording (4), mixing (4)
 Goapele – background vocals (5)
 Bicasso – production (5)
 Tajai – vocals (6), additional vocals (8), recording
 Eric McFadden – mandolin (6), guitar (6, 12)
 Mako – production (7, 9)
 Erika – additional vocals (8)
 Toure – production (8), recording
 Domino – production (10, 15)
 The Grouch – vocals (11)
 Major Terror – vocals (13)
 Moses Milliyons – djembe (16)
 Matt Kelley – additional recording, engineering, mixing
 Ken Lee – mastering
 Lady T – art direction
 Gannon Graphics – design
 B+ – photography

References

External links
 

2001 debut albums
Pep Love albums
Hieroglyphics Imperium Recordings albums
Albums produced by A-Plus (rapper)
Albums produced by Evidence (musician)